Yahoo! Kickstart was a professional network created by Yahoo! for college students, recent graduates, employers and alumni. The service was similar to LinkedIn, initially aimed at connecting students and alumni of the same university professionally, with recruiters joining later in the network's inception. Yahoo! offered a $25,000 prize to whichever college or university that got the greatest number of alumni to sign up before December 31, 2007. Kickstart's "Preview" (beta) was launched on November 5, 2007 by Yahoo!'s Advanced Products team, based in San Francisco. Yahoo closed down the network in 2008, amidst reports of server downtime and error messages. Users were redirected to Yahoo! HotJobs as an alternative for jobseekers.

References

External links
Kickstart Homepage

Professional networks
Kickstart
Defunct social networking services